Sidehatch Entertainment Group (SEG) is a Boston-based music company with brands in concert and festival promotion, marketing, industry consulting, tour bus rentals, software development and client-based services, including presentation, performance, and organization.

History 
SEG was founded in 2004 by Ben Maitland-Lewis, whilst attending Berklee College of Music.

Past SEG clients include Wilco, Newport Folk Festival, Daniel Lanois, Piebald, the PTown Festival, Boston Urban Music Project and Bowery Presents.

Current Products

Sidecast 
Internet radio podcast available on iTunes featuring music from SEG artists, interviews with major label artists and professionals such as Fat Mike (NOFX), Bryn Bennett, (Bang Camaro), and Enter Shikari.

Grease Bus 
The SEG crew overhauled a 19-passenger shuttle bus, creating an eco-friendly grease burning tour bus, enabling bands to get on the road whilst avoiding the expense of gas prices.

Sound and Video Production 
The SEG office, located in Charlestown, Boston, shares space with a live venue and recording studio frequented by local Boston as well as touring acts.

Indie Ambassador 
Founded in 2009 by Ben Maitland-Lewis and Chris Cave of Sidehatch, Indie Ambassador is a software development company currently in pre-beta, slated to launch during 2011 with a new platform geared towards independent artists. Though not yet released, the platform is 'intended to create a horizontal playing field for bands seeking to do business.'

Indie Ambassador TV 
Indie Ambassador TV, a YouTube channel and an internet blog presented by Indie Ambassador (see above), is designed to feature performances and interviews from a variety of artists who represent the growing trend for independence in the entertainment industry.

Apprenticeship Program 
Ben Maitland-Lewis and Christopher Thomas of Sidehatch Entertainment lead an 8th Grade Academy apprenticeship program (in addition to a college-level internship program) on CD Business. They teach students the fundamentals of creating a Business Plan, a Marketing Plan, how to identify their target audience, pitch the project, and produce a CD to be sold to their local communities and businesses. The money raised from these exercises is invested through the Summit Group and goes to the Alumni Scholarship Fund for the student's college tuition.

Discography

References

External links 
 Sidehatch Homepage

Companies based in Boston
Entertainment companies of the United States